The Ayyubid Mosque of Omar is an Islamic place of worship inside the Old City of Jerusalem. It is located opposite the southern courtyard of the Church of the Holy Sepulchre, in the Muristan area of the Christian Quarter. The mosque is not open to tourists, and can be accessed only for praying.

History
According to local tradition, after the Siege of Jerusalem in 637 by the Rashidun army under the command of Abu Ubaidah ibn al-Jarrah, Patriarch Sophronius refused to surrender except to the Caliph Omar (579-644) himself. Omar travelled to Jerusalem and accepted the surrender. He then approached the Church of the Holy Sepulchre and Patriarch Sophronius invited the Caliph to pray inside the church, but Omar declined so as not to set a precedent and thereby endanger the church's status as a Christian site. Instead he prayed outside, on the steps east of the church. The Mosque of Omar was later built at that site, as evidenced by a stone plate with a Kufic inscription found in 1897 in the area of the eastern or outer atrium of the Constantinian (4th-century) Church of the Holy Sepulchre, defining this area as a mosque.

The current structure was built in its current shape by the Ayyubid Sultan Al-Afdal ibn Salah ad-Din in 1193 to commemorate the prayer of the caliph Omar.

Architecture 
The current structure was built in its current shape by the Ayyubid Sultan Al-Afdal ibn Salah ad-Din in 1193 to commemorate the prayer of the caliph Omar. The entrance to the Church of the Holy Sepulchre had by then moved from the east to the south of the church, as a result of repeated destructive events that affected the Holy Sepulchre and Muslim mosques during the 11th and 12th centuries.

The Al-Khanqah al-Salahiyya Mosque, located on the other (northern) side of the Church of the Holy Sepulchre, has an almost identical minaret, erected in 1418.

Gallery

References

Further reading
 Busse, Heribert, Die 'Umar-Moschee im östlichen Atrium der Grabeskirche (lit. "The Mosque of 'Umar in the eastern atrium of the Church of the Holy Sepulchre"), Zeitschrift des deutschen Palästina-Vereins, 109 (1993), pp. 73–82.

Religious buildings and structures completed in 1193
Mamluk architecture in the State of Palestine
Mosques in Jerusalem
Religious organizations established in the 12th century
12th-century mosques
Christian Quarter